TAE Avia, formerly named TransAVIAexport Airlines, is a Belarusian national cargo airline. It is based at Minsk International Airport in Belarus, with a hub at Sharjah International Airport, in the United Arab Emirates.

History
TransAVIAexport Airlines was established in December 1992 in Belarus. The airline operates worldwide cargo flights.

On December 2, 2021, TransAVIAexport and two aircraft belonging to the airline were added to the Specially Designated Nationals and Blocked Persons List by the United States Department of the Treasury.

In 2021, the airline changed its name to TAE Avia.

Fleet 

TAE Avia's fleet included the following aircraft (as of August 2019):

 1 Boeing 747-300SF
 5 Ilyushin Il-76TD

Accidents and incidents
On March 9, 2007, a TransAVIAexport Airlines Ilyushin Il-76TD (s/n 1003499991, registered EW-78826), on approach at Mogadishu, Somalia, was hit by a projectile, which was later confirmed to be a RPG by Belarus officials.  The aircraft landed safely but sustained substantial damage.

On March 23, 2007, a TransAVIAexport Airlines Ilyushin Il-76TD (s/n 1013405192, registered EW-78849) was shot down by an anti-aircraft missile while taking off from Mogadishu, Somalia.

On August 22, 2017, a TransAVIAexport Airlines Ilyushin Il-76TD (registered EW-78799) on approach to Juba, South Sudan struck a tree short of the runway, destroying several houses and killing a 5-year-old girl.

References

External links

Airlines of Belarus
Airlines established in 1992
Cargo airlines
Companies based in Minsk
Belarusian companies established in 1992
Specially Designated Nationals and Blocked Persons List
Belarusian entities subject to the U.S. Department of the Treasury sanctions